Andrea Grendene (born 4 July 1986) is a former Italian professional road bicycle racer, who rode as a professional between 2009 and 2011.

Biography 
Born in Thiene, Italy, Grendene currently lives in Montecchio Precalcino, near Vicenza. He was a member of the Under 23 Italian National Team in Tour of Flanders and the Ville de Saguenay races in 2008.

References

External links

1986 births
Living people
Italian male cyclists
Cyclists from the Province of Vicenza
People from Thiene